Gennadi Aleksandrovich Krasnitsky (August 27, 1940 in Tashkent – June 12, 1988 in Qurghonteppa, suicide by jumping out of the highrise window) was a Soviet football player.

Career

He became the first Uzbekistani player scored 100 goals in Soviet Top League to enter the Grigory Fedotov club. The club of top-scoring footballers in Uzbekistan is named after him - Gennadi Krasnitsky club, was founded in 2010.

Honours
 Grigory Fedotov club member: 112 (goals)

International career
Krasnitsky made his debut for USSR on May 21, 1961 in a friendly against Poland.

External links
  Profile

1940 births
1988 deaths
Uzbekistani footballers
Soviet footballers
Soviet Union international footballers
Soviet football managers
Soviet Top League players
Pakhtakor Tashkent FK players
Pakhtakor Tashkent FK managers
Sportspeople from Tashkent
Association football forwards
Suicides by jumping
Suicides in the Soviet Union